Maine's Italian sandwich, sometimes referred to as the Maine Italian sandwich, is an American submarine sandwich in Italian-American cuisine prepared on a long bread roll or bun with meats, cheese and various vegetables. The Maine Italian sandwich was supposedly invented in Portland, Maine.

Preparation
In Maine, the traditional Italian sandwich is prepared using a long bread roll or bun with meats such as ham along with American or provolone cheese, tomato, onion, green bell pepper, Greek olives, olive oil or salad oil, salt and cracked black pepper.  Ham is the default meat unless another is specified, so ordering a "Ham Italian" is considered redundant. The sandwich is often cut in half to make it easier to handle. The flavors and texture of the sandwich are unified by the ingredients used to create a gastronomic equilibrium, with the fats and acids in the ingredients serving to counterbalance one another.

History
Giovanni Amato, a grocer in Portland, Maine claims to have invented the "Italian sandwich". While selling his bread on his street cart, Amato received requests from dockworkers to slice his long bread rolls and add sliced meat, cheese and vegetables to them. Amato later opened a sandwich shop named Amato's, and today the sandwich continues to be prepared by Amato's sandwich shops. The Amato's version is traditionally prepared using fresh-baked bread, ham, American cheese, slices of tomato, onions, green pepper and sour pickle, Kalamata olives and salad oil.

See also

 Submarine sandwich
 Cuisine of Portland, Maine
 Cuisine of New England
 List of sandwiches

References

Further reading

 

American sandwiches
European American culture in Maine
New England cuisine
Italian-American cuisine
Culture of Portland, Maine
Cheese sandwiches
1903 introductions